Annapolis Valley First Nation Reserve (formerly known as Cambridge 32) is a Miꞌkmaq reserve located in Kings County, Nova Scotia.

It is administratively part of the Annapolis Valley First Nation.

References

Indian reserves in Nova Scotia
Communities in Kings County, Nova Scotia
Mi'kmaq in Canada